Stephen Bosse is an Australian former professional rugby league footballer who played in the 1990s. He played for Penrith and Balmain in the NSWRL/ARL competition.

Playing career
Bosse made his first grade debut for Penrith in round 2 of the 1994 NSWRL season at Kogarah Oval. Bosse played at prop in Penrith's 8-6 victory. Bosse played a total of three games for Penrith in 1994. After having not played first grade for three years, Bosse signed with Balmain and made one appearance for the club against Illawarra in round 2 of the 1997 ARL season.

References

1974 births
Balmain Tigers players
Penrith Panthers players
Australian rugby league players
Rugby league props
Living people